Psalm 36 is the 36th psalm of the Book of Psalms, beginning in English in the King James Version: "The transgression of the wicked saith within my heart". The Book of Psalms is part of the third section of the Hebrew Bible, and a book of the Christian Old Testament. In the slightly different numbering system used in the Greek Septuagint and Latin Vulgate translations of the Bible, this psalm is Psalm 35. In Latin, it is known as Dixit iniustus  or Dixit injustus. The psalm is a hymn psalm, attributed to David.

The psalm forms a regular part of Jewish, Catholic, Lutheran, Anglican and other Protestant liturgies. It has inspired hymns based on it, and has often been set to music, by Baroque composers such as Heinrich Schütz as well as contemporary composers such as Richard Nance.

Parts of this psalm have been singled out, for example "In Thy light shall we see light" (in Latin: "In lumine Tuo videbimus lumen") which is the motto of Columbia University, and which appears on its university seal.

Background
The text of the psalm refers to its Davidic authorship, for the chief musician of the temple. Matthew Henry suggests that David wrote this psalm after being attacked, either by Saul or by his son Absalom, as the psalm begins with a complaint against "the malice of his enemies against him". After decrying the "sinfulness of sin" in the first five verses, David lauds God's goodness toward all people and creatures.

The psalm may be understood literally, as a prayer of the persecuted who has taken refuge in the temple, or figuratively, of one who has taken refuge in God. The psalmist takes pride in the goodness of God in which he finds safety. The psalm concludes with a plea to God to bless those who honor him with his justice, and protect them from the snares of the wicked. Catholic bishop Richard Challoner's version describes this psalm as "an exhortation to despise this world and the short prosperity of the wicked, and to trust in Providence".

Text

Hebrew Bible version
Following is the Hebrew text of Psalm 36:

King James Version 
¹The transgression of the wicked saith within my heart,
    that there is no fear of God before his eyes.
²For he flattereth himself in his own eyes,
    until his iniquity be found to be hateful.
³The words of his mouth are iniquity and deceit:
    he hath left off to be wise, and to do good.
⁴He deviseth mischief upon his bed;
    he setteth himself in a way that is not good;
        he abhorreth not evil.

⁵Thy mercy, O LORD, is in the heavens;
    and thy faithfulness reacheth unto the clouds.
⁶Thy righteousness is like the great mountains;
        thy judgments are a great deep:
    O LORD, thou preservest man and beast.
⁷How excellent is thy lovingkindness, O God!
    therefore the children of men put their trust under the shadow of thy wings.
⁸They shall be abundantly satisfied with the fatness of thy house;
    and thou shalt make them drink of the river of thy pleasures.
⁹For with thee is the fountain of life:
    in thy light shall we see light.
¹⁰O continue thy lovingkindness unto them that know thee;
   and thy righteousness to the upright in heart.
¹¹Let not the foot of pride come against me,
    and let not the hand of the wicked remove me.

¹²There are the workers of iniquity fallen:
    they are cast down, and shall not be able to rise.

Verse 1
The wording in the King James Version, The transgression of the wicked saith within my heart, raises some difficulties. Alexander Kirkpatrick suggests that it is "unnatural to regard transgression as uttering its oracle in the Psalmist’s heart", and he argues that the reading of the Septuagint, Vulgate, Syriac texts and Jerome, within his heart, is a preferable reading. The Revised Standard Version (1946, 1952) has the wording, in his heart, and the 1989 New Revised Standard Version uses the words in their hearts.

Verse 6
The juxtaposition of man and animal in verse 6, You save man and beast, has been subject to various interpretations. The Talmud (Chullin 5b) says that "beast" refers to "people who are wise in understanding but make themselves simple like a dumb beast". The Midrash (Genesis Rabbah 33:1) interprets this verse as meaning that God saves man in the merit of the animals. The verse is also seen by Jewish ethicists as endorsing animal welfare and animal rights. Saint Augustine suggests that this verse proves that animals also receive salvation.

Verse 9
The fountain of life mentioned in verse 9 (verse 8 in the KJV) has been depicted, for example on a stained glass window at the Catholic church  in Bündheim, part of Bad Harzburg, Lower Saxony, Germany. The phrase has been used in the context of preservation of the natural environment, such as an initiative of Christian churches in Württemberg to focus on Wasser, Gabe Gottes (Water, gift of God) on the "Tag der Schöpfung" (Day of Creation), 1 September in 2006.

Uses

Judaism
Verse 7 is one of three verses which make up the prayer of Tzidkatcha ("Your righteousness") recited after the Chazan's repetition of the Amidah during the Shabbat afternoon prayer. In Sephardi traditions and Nusach Sefard, it is the first of the three verses recited in consecutive order: Psalms 36:7, 71:19, 119:42. In Nusach Ashkenaz, the order is reversed: Psalms 119:42, 71:19, 36:7.

Verses 8–11 are recited after the wrapping of the tallit during the morning prayer service.

Verse 9 is incorporated into the Shabbat evening table song Kol Mekadesh Shevii.

Verse 10 is part of the Selichot prayers.

Verse 12 is said during Maariv on Yom Kippur night.

In the Siddur Sfas Emes, Psalm 36 is recited on behalf of a sick person.

New Testament
Verse 1b is quoted in Romans .

Catholic Church
In the liturgy of the Mass, Psalm 36 is read on Wednesday of Week 16 in Ordinary Time, Year II.

Book of Common Prayer
In the Church of England's Book of Common Prayer, this psalm is appointed to be read on the morning of the seventh day of the month.

Seal and books

The Vulgate version of verse 10, "In lumine Tuo videbimus lumen" ("In Thy light shall we see light") is part of the original heraldic seal of Columbia University, adopted in 1755. Several books also take this phrase as their title, including the Valparaiso University prayerbook, In Thy Light We See Light, the Bible study book In Thy Light I See Light, and the Christian biography In His Light, I See Light Psalms 36:9: A Prodigal's Journey Into the Light.

Besides Columbia University, a number of other universities have mottos which were inspired by Psalm 36:9, including the University of Fort Hare (South Africa), St. Mary's University (Calgary), and Valparaiso University (Indiana).

Hymns and musical settings
Hymns based on Psalm 36 include in English "Praise to the Lord, the Almighty" and "Immortal, Invisible, God Only Wise". The refrain and the first stanza of the German song "Herr, deine Güte reicht, so weit der Himmel ist" (Lord, your goodness extends as far as heaven)", published in 1965 with text by Gerhard Valentin and a melody by Herbert Beuerle, is based on verses from Psalm 36. Maria Luise Thurmair wrote "Herr, deine Güt ist unbegrenzt" based on Psalm 36, published in 1971 with the melody of "O Mensch, bewein dein Sünde groß".

The psalm and selected verses have often been set to music. Thomas Ravenscroft wrote a setting for four-part choir in English on a French melody, published in his collection The Whole Booke of Psalmes in 1621, with the incipit "The wicked with his works unjust". Heinrich Schütz set the psalm in German with the text from the Becker Psalter, Ich sag's von Grund meins Herzens frei (I say it freely from the depth of my heart), for choir as his SWV 133. George Garrett set the psalm for the Anglican Church, titled Psalm 36. Dixit injustus and the incipit "My heart showeth me the wickedness of the ungodly". Richard Nance set the psalm for choir in 2002 on a commission by the American Choral Directors Association as the Raymond W. Brock memorial composition, published by Walton Music.

The passage "How precious is your unfailing love, O God" was set by David Lee in a larger composition in 2012, and has been used as a Responsorial.

Notes

References

External links

 
 
 Psalms Chapter 36 text in Hebrew and English, mechon-mamre.org
 Psalm 36 – Mercy to the Heavens text and detailed commentary, enduringword.com
 For the leader. Of David, the servant of the LORD. text and footnotes, usccb.org United States Conference of Catholic Bishops
 Psalm 36:1 introduction and text, biblestudytools.com
 Charles H. Spurgeon: Psalm 36 detailed commentary, archive.spurgeon.org
 Psalm 36 / Refrain: With you, O God, is the well of life. 
 The Fountain of Life and Light Podcast on Psalm 36:9, Church of England

036
Works attributed to David